The Magic World of Topo Gigio is a 1961 Italian family puppets film directed by Federico Caldura. It is also known as The Italian Mouse and The World of Topo Gigio. It was the first full-length feature film of the Topo Gigio Italian children's television series.

Cast
Armando Benetti
Ignazio Colnaghi
Carlo Delfini
Ignazio Dolce
Peppino Mazzulo as Topo Gigio
Federica Milani
Ermanno Roveri
Milena Zini

References

External links

 

1961 films
Columbia Pictures animated films
Columbia Pictures films
1960s Italian-language films
Italian animated fantasy films
Italian animated films
1960s American films
1960s Italian films